John Henry Clarke (29 June 1876 – 25 February 1955) was an Australian rules footballer who played for the Fitzroy Football Club in the Victorian Football League (VFL).

Clarke, who played finals in each of his seven league seasons, was the centreman in Fitzroy's 1898, 1899 and 1904 premierships teams. He was also a losing grand finalist in 1900 and 1903.

References

External links 
 
 

1876 births
Australian rules footballers from Victoria (Australia)
Fitzroy Football Club players
Fitzroy Football Club Premiership players
1946 deaths
Three-time VFL/AFL Premiership players
Australian rules footballers from South Australia